Frederic Asgill Carter (13 June 1853 – 1 August 1924) was an English first-class cricketer. He was a right-handed batsman and a roundarm right arm fast bowler who played mainly for Gloucestershire County Cricket Club from 1871 to 1873. Carter was born at Newnham on Severn, Gloucestershire.

Carter made 10 first-class appearances, scoring 75 runs at a batting average of 7.50, and a high score of 13 not out. He held 6 catches in his career and took 2 wickets at 44.00, with a best analysis of 1–15.

Carter died at Hurlingham, London on 1 August 1924.

References

1853 births
1924 deaths
English cricketers
English cricketers of 1864 to 1889
Gloucestershire cricketers
People from Newnham on Severn